Heinz Gerhard Lehmann (20 October 1921, Königsberg – 8 June 1995, Berlin) was a German chess master and 1956 West Berlin Chess Champion.

Biography 
Lehmann was born in Königsberg in 1921, studied law. As a chess player, he received FIDE title, International Master (IM) in 1961. He won 1956 Berlin City Chess Championship and 1976 European Chess Club Cup. He was a national player in the 1950s and 1960s, took part in the 13th and 14th Chess Olympiad. He played for West Germany in the 1957 European Chess Championship, and won the individual bronze medal for his board.

At the 1965 Capablanca Memorial Tournament, he played against Bobby Fischer in the first round, lost in 32 moves.

Lehmann became an Honorary Grandmaster (GM) in 1992. He died on 8 June 1995 in Berlin.

Achievements 

 1956  – Berlin City Chess Championship – Champion
 1957 –  European Team Chess Championship – Bronze (individual)
 1957  – Bad Neueunahr – 3rd
 1958  – Malta Open – 1st
 1958  – San Benedetto del Tronto 7th Festival – 2-3rd
 1962  –  Reggio Emilia  – 2nd
 1968  –  OLOT, Spain  – 1st
 1968  –  Stary Smokovec 17th High Tatra Cup  – 1st
 1976  –  European Chess Club Cup - 1st (team)

References

External links 

 Heinz Lehmann at Chessgames

Chess grandmasters
German chess players
1921 births
1995 deaths